George Burr may refer to:

George Burr (cricketer) (1819–1857), English cricketer and priest
George Lincoln Burr (1857–1938), American historian, diplomat, author and educator
George Elbert Burr (1859–1939), American printmaker and painter
George Washington Burr (1865–1923), American general
George Houston Burr (1881–1958), American architect